Pharmacy Council of Sindh is a statutory and regulatory body of Sindh Province, Pakistan that was established under the Drugs Act of 1967. The Council is responsible for issuing licenses to Category-A pharmacists, for conducting examinations of Category-B pharmacists and educating pharmacy technicians regarding documentation of medical stores.

The Pharmacy Council of Sindh is affiliated with the Pharmacy Council of Pakistan.

External links 
Pharmacy Council Pakistan.

Pharmacy organisations in Pakistan
Organisations based in Sindh